Zipoetes is a genus of beetles in the family Cerambycidae, containing the following species:

subgenus Athyllus
 Zipoetes lineatus (Distant, 1898)

subgenus Zipoetes
 Zipoetes grisescens Fairmaire, 1897
 Zipoetes rufescens Breuning, 1940

References

Agapanthiini